Bengt A. Robertson was a Swedish physician. Robertson was primarily known for the development of the synthetic lung surfactant known as Corusurf. In 1996 he was awarded the King Faisal International Prize in Medicine together with Tetsurō Fujiwara for contributions to the understanding of neonatal medicine.

References

Biography articles needing translation from German Wikipedia
1935 births
2008 deaths
20th-century Swedish physicians